Sclerophrys tihamica is a species of toad in the family Bufonidae. It is endemic to the Arabian Peninsula and occurs along the Red Sea coastline of Saudi Arabia and Yemen. It is sometimes known as Balletto's toad. Reports of Bufo pentoni (now Sclerophrys pentoni) from the Arabian Peninsula refer to this species.

Sclerophrys tihamica is a common and abundant species in wadis and irrigated areas. Breeding takes place in still or slow-moving water. There are no known threats to this species.

References

tihamica
Amphibians of the Middle East
Endemic fauna of Saudi Arabia
Endemic fauna of Yemen
Amphibians described in 1973
Taxonomy articles created by Polbot